Multinational Engineer Battalion Tisa is an engineering unit intended to quickly respond to flooding and other natural disasters in the Carpathian Region. Initial idea for creation of such unit was voiced by Ukraine in December 1998. Battalion was created on November 15, 2002 after Heads of General Staff of Hungarian, Romanian, Slovak and Ukrainian Armed Forces signed the Technical Arrangement on Implementation of Intergovernmental Agreement on Multinational Engineer Battalion Tisa in Budapest. The name comes from river Tisza.

Annual exercise is held by participating nations, who take turns hosting the exercise. Exercise is held under the name Light Avalanche. First exercise was held in Ukraine in 2002 as Tysa-2002.

Structure
Each participating country provides up to 200 soldiers. In January 2012 total size was 703. Ukrainian part is from the 128th Mechanized Brigade. Hungary provides soldiers from 5th Infantry Brigade and the 37th Engineering Regiment Romania provides 52nd Engineering Battalion "TISA".
Slovakia provides a company from Engineer Battalion in Sereď.

 Headquarters Company (10 representatives from each country)
 Ukrainian Engineering Company "інженерна рота"
 Ukrainian Road Engineering Company "інженерно-дорожня рота"
 Ukrainian Signal Platoon "взвод зв’язку"
 Ukrainian Repair Platoon "ремонтний взвод"
 Ukrainian Logistics Platoon "взвод матеріального забезпечення"
 Romanian Engineering Company
 Romanian Engineering Company
 Hungarian Engineering Company "műszaki század"
 Slovakian Engineering Company "ženijná technická rota"

Equipment
60 units including 6 PTS-2

References

Sources
«Light avalanche 2014», report of ТРК «Виноградів ТВ». 

Multinational army units and formations
Military units and formations established in 2002
Military units and formations of Ukraine
Military units and formations of Romania
Military units and formations of Hungary
Military units and formations of Slovakia